Deh-e Shadi may refer to:
 Deh-e Shadi, Sistan and Baluchestan
 Deh-e Shadi, Hirmand, Sistan and Baluchestan Province
 Deh-e Shadi, South Khorasan